The A4138 is a main road in Carmarthenshire, Wales, connecting Pontarddulais with Llanelli.  Running in a northeast to southwest direction, the road connects with M4 junction 48. Northeast of the motorway, the road is classified as a non-primary route, while southwest of the motorway, the road is classified as a primary route. In both instances, the road is operated by Carmarthenshire County Council.

Proposals
There have been proposals to make the southwestern section from the M4 to Llanelli a trunk road, which would be operated by the Welsh Assembly Government, but these have been rejected.
The local council has a policy to reject any planning application that would prevent or adversely affect the implementation of a dual carriageway between the M4 and Trostre.

Places served
Settlements served by the road include:
Pontarddulais
Hendy
Llangennech
Dafen
Llanelli

References

Roads in Wales
Transport in Carmarthenshire